Black in Deep Red is an oil on canvas painting by Latvian American artist Mark Rothko, from 1957. It is now in a private collection after it was sold in 2000 for $3,306,000.

References

1957 paintings
Paintings by Mark Rothko